Dominik Gross (born 28 September 1964 in St. Wendel/Saarland, Germany) is a German bioethicist and historian of medicine. He is Professor and Director of the Institute of History, Theory and Ethics in Medicine at the RWTH Aachen University, Germany.

Education
Gross studied dentistry and medicine at Saarland University and the University of Ulm as well as history, philosophy and archaeology at Saarland University. After completing his habilitation thesis in history, theory and ethics of medicine at the University of Würzburg, Bavaria, he worked as a lecturer at the Universities of Würzburg, Ratisbon and Ulm.

Career
In June 2005, Gross was appointed full professor of History, Theory and Ethics in Medicine at the RWTH Aachen. Since October 2005 he is director of the Institute of History, Theory and Ethics in Medicine of the same university. He is also a visiting professor at the University of Zurich, Switzerland. Gross’ main fields of research are ethics of medical technologies as well as medicine in the 20th century (with a special focus on the Third Reich).

Gross is a member of the Ethics Group of the IDEA League and editor of a book series at Lit Publishers called “Anthropina”, “Medizin und Nationalsozialismus” and at Campus called “Todesbilder”.

In 2010, he was appointed as a member of the "National AIDS Advisory Council“ ("Nationaler AIDS-Beirat“), an official advisory board of the Federal Ministry of Health. Dominik Groß is also an appointed member of the "European Academy of Sciences and Arts".

Gross is editor-in-chief of “Sudhoffs Archiv – Zeitschrift für Wissenschaftsgeschichte”.

Gross’ work won a research Fellowship of the Deutsche Forschungsgemeinschaft (1996–1998), the Joseph Schneider Award of the Medical Faculty of the University of Würzburg (2002) and the Scultetus Award of the Scultetus Society in Ulm (2004)[8] and the Dental Ethics Award of the German Society for Oral and Maxillofacial Medicine (DGZMK) (2017, 2018, 2019).

In 2010, he was appointed as a member of the "National AIDS Advisory Council“ ("Nationaler AIDS-Beirat“), an official advisory board of the Federal Ministry of Health.

Bibliography

Books

Chapters in books

Journal articles

Other

References

 Das Institut für Geschichte, Theorie und Ethik der Medizin an der RWTH Aachen : Personen, Projekte, Perspektiven; Jahresbericht 2009, Aachen 2010.
 Das Institut für Geschichte, Theorie und Ethik der Medizin der RWTH Aachen: Personen, Projekte, Perspektiven, Jahresbericht 2017/2018, Aachen 2019,

External links
 Dominik Groß at Deutsche Nationalbibliothek

Bioethicists
20th-century German historians
Academic staff of RWTH Aachen University
University of Ulm alumni
Living people
German male non-fiction writers
Year of birth missing (living people)
21st-century German historians
German medical historians